West Point High School is in Clay County, Mississippi. It is part of the West Point Consolidated School District. Its North Campus serves grades 8 and 9, while South Campus grades 10 to 12. The school has about 800 students. A little more than 80 percent are African American while about 17 percent are white. 100 percent of students a disadvantaged and all of them participate in the free lunch program. Subject proficiency in math and reading are below the state average. Green Wave is the school mascot.

In May 2021 the school had four valedictorians. 

In 2020, the school's football team had its first home loss since 2015.

History
West Point was served by Lynch High School in the early 20th century. The school burned in 1928 and was replaced by West Point High School in 1929.

The school has won 11 state football championships including four in a row.

Alumni
Johnny Green (gridiron football)
Vontarrius Dora, former linebacker
Lyndon Johnson (American football)
Orlando Bobo, American football guard
Tyrone Bell
Jesse Anderson football player
Carey Henley, football player
Brandon Walker, Barstool Sports

References

Public high schools in Mississippi
Lists of schools in Mississippi